Otto Christian Ludwig Lagerfeld (20 September 1881 – 4 July 1967) was a German businessman, who in 1919 founded the German company Lagerfeld & Co, which imported evaporated milk. 

He was the son of a wine merchant from Hamburg, Tönnies Johann Otto Lagerfeld (1845–1931) and his wife Maria Wilhelmine Franziska Lagerfeld (née Wiegels) (1848-1936). He was married to Theresia Feigl (1896-1922) in 1922; they had a daughter Theodora Dorothea "Thea" Lagerfeld (1922- circa 2007).  His first wife died the same year of their marriage. In 1930 he remarried to Elisabeth Josefa Emilie Bahlmann (1897–1978), daughter of the Catholic Centre Party local politician Heinrich Maria Karl Bahlmann, and they were the parents of Martha Christiane "Christel" Lagerfeld (1931-2015) and of fashion designer Karl Lagerfeld (1933-2019).    

Otto Lagerfeld and his family belonged to the Old Catholic Church.
His family was mainly shielded from the deprivations of World War II due to his business interests in Germany through the firm Glücksklee-Milch GmbH. Otto Lagerfeld had been in San Francisco during the 1906 earthquake.

References

1881 births
1967 deaths
Businesspeople from Hamburg
German Old Catholics